The 1946 Tasmanian state election was held on 23 November 1946. The Nationalist Party had become the Liberal Party since the 1941 election.

Retiring Members

Labor
Ernest West MHA (Wilmot)

Liberal
Henry Baker MHA (Franklin)
Frank Marriott MHA (Bass)
Sir John McPhee MHA (Franklin)

House of Assembly
Sitting members are shown in bold text. Tickets that elected at least one MHA are highlighted in the relevant colour. Successful candidates are indicated by an asterisk (*).

Bass
Six seats were up for election. The Labor Party was defending four seats. The Liberal Party was defending two seats, although John Ockerby had not joined the Liberal Party and was running as an independent.

Darwin
Six seats were up for election. The Labor Party was defending four seats. The Liberal Party was defending two seats.

Denison
Six seats were up for election. The Labor Party was defending four seats. The Liberal Party was defending two seats.

Franklin
Six seats were up for election. The Labor Party was defending four seats. The Liberal Party was defending two seats.

Wilmot
Six seats were up for election. The Labor Party was defending four seats. The Liberal Party was defending two seats, although Sir Walter Lee was running as an independent.

See also
 Members of the Tasmanian House of Assembly, 1941–1946
 Members of the Tasmanian House of Assembly, 1946–1948

References
Tasmanian Parliamentary Library

Candidates for Tasmanian state elections